Robert Galbraith may refer to:
 Robert Galbraith (judge) (died 1543), Scottish Lord of Session
 Robert Galbraith (1483−1544), Scottish logician who taught with Juan de Celaya
 Robert Leslie Thomas Galbraith (1841–1924), Irish-born merchant and political figure in British Columbia
 Robert Galbraith (Medal of Honor) (1878–1949), United States Navy Gunner's Mate, 3rd class
 Robert Galbraith, a pen name of Joanne Rowling (born 1965), British novelist, also known under her other pen name J. K. Rowling

See also
 Rob Galbraith, photographer and photojournalism teacher
 Robert Galbraith Heath (1915–1999), American psychiatrist